The 1995 All-Ireland Junior Hurling Championship was the 74th staging of the All-Ireland Junior Championship since its establishment by the Gaelic Athletic Association in 1912.

Cork entered the championship as the defending champions, however, they were beaten by Clare in the Munster semi-final.

The All-Ireland final was played on 12 August at Semple Stadium in Thurles, between Kilkenny and Clare, in what was their second meeting in the final in three years. Kilkenny won the match by 1-20 to 1-06 to claim their 9th and final championship title and a first title since 1990.

Results

Leinster Junior Hurling Championship

Leinster quarter-final

Leinster semi-finals

Leinster final

Munster Junior Hurling Championship

Munster first round

Munster semi-finals

Munster final

All-Ireland Junior Hurling Championship

All-Ireland semi-final

All-Ireland final

Championship statistics

Top scorers

Top scorers overall

Top scorers in a single game

References

Junior
All-Ireland Junior Hurling Championship